Newberry Friends Meeting House, now the Friends of Jesus Fellowship Friends Church, is a historic Quaker meeting house and cemetery located in Paoli Township, Orange County, Indiana.  It was built in 1856, and is a one-story, rectangular, vernacular Greek Revival style frame building. It sits on a rubble limestone foundation and is sheathed in clapboard siding.  The adjacent cemetery was established in 1818, and the earliest marked burials date to the 1840s.  The congregation played a significant role in the settlement of African Americans in Orange County.

It was listed on the National Register of Historic Places in 1996.

References 

African-American history of Indiana
Quaker meeting houses in Indiana
Churches on the National Register of Historic Places in Indiana
Greek Revival church buildings in Indiana
1818 establishments in Indiana
Churches completed in 1856
Churches in Orange County, Indiana
National Register of Historic Places in Orange County, Indiana